Robert Abraham (1410–1470) was a Member of Parliament for Portsmouth.

Life 
Parliamentary historian J.C. Wedgwood has suggested he was the son of an earlier MP for the same constituency, Henry Abraham.

He was elected member to attend the parliaments of 1433 and 1449–1450. He last appears on official records when, in 1467, he acted as pledge for another MP for the same constituency, Henry Uvedale.

References

1410 births
1470 deaths
English MPs 1433
English MPs November 1449
Members of the Parliament of England (pre-1707) for Portsmouth